Saint Dominic Academy (SDA) is a private college-preparatory for girls in seventh through twelfth grades, located in Jersey City, in Hudson County, New Jersey, United States. The school, which is situated within the Roman Catholic Archdiocese of Newark, and is administered by the Dominican Sisters of Caldwell, New Jersey, has been accredited by the Middle States Association of Colleges and Schools Commission on Elementary and Secondary Schools since 1991.

As of the 2017–18 school year, the school had an enrollment of 255 students and 26.9 classroom teachers (on an FTE basis), for a student–teacher ratio of 9.5:1. The school's student body was 51.8% (132) White, 20.0% (51) Hispanic, 14.1% (36) Asian, 9.0% (23) Black and 5.1% (13) two or more races.

History 
The school was founded in 1878 by a community of nuns from New York, with the objective to educate children of immigrants, primarily German. On March 7, 1942, SDA moved to its present location on Kennedy Boulevard. In 1994, a new wing was open with new computer labs, science and language labs. The school celebrated its 135th birthday on October 23, 2013. In 2015, Saint Dominic Academy received a generous donation of a building located on Fairmount Avenue in Jersey City. This building was once the Jersey City Women's Club and is now known as Siena Hall, which opened in April 2016 and is used for school-related events.

Saint Dominic Academy is a member of the New Jersey Association of Independent Schools.

Academics 
Certain minimum requirements have been established by the Middle States Association of Colleges and Schools and Saint Dominic Academy for graduation. These are expressed in terms of successful completion of specific courses and credits.

Graduation requirements:
 4 years of English 
 4 years of Math (exceeds the NJ State standards) 
 3 years of History 
 3 years of Science
 2 years of a World Language (Spanish and French)
 4 years of Religious Studies
 4 years of Physical Education and Drivers Education
 1 semester of Art and Music
 1 semester of Computer Literacy
 4 electives
 Community service hours vary per grade level and are required for graduation

Academic Levels - College Preparatory/Honors/Advanced Placement:

 68 College-preparatory (CP) courses
 18 Honors level courses
 7 Advanced Placement courses
 200 Virtual High School courses
 50 College Level courses earning credit from Saint Peter's University
 4 College Level courses earning credit from Seton Hall University

Physical education 

Physical education courses are conducted at Saint Peter's University located just a few blocks away from the high school. Students have use of the university's gym/athletic facilities including fitness center, basketball and tennis courts, jogging track, and a competitive swimming pool.

Athletics 
The Saint Dominic Academy Blue Devils compete in the Hudson County Interscholastic League, which is comprised of private and parochial high schools in Hudson County and operates under the supervision of the New Jersey State Interscholastic Athletic Association. With 340 students in grades 10–12, the school was classified by the NJSIAA for the 2019–20 school year as Non-Public B for most athletic competition purposes, which included schools with an enrollment of 37 to 366 students in that grade range (equivalent to Group II for public schools).

The school's interscholastic sports include:
Cross Country
Soccer
Tennis
Volleyball
Basketball
Dance
Track & Field
Swimming
Softball

The track team won the indoor track Non-Public state championship in 2016.

The track team won the indoor relay Non-Public B title in 2018.

Extracurricular activities 
SDA hosts a range of after-school clubs. These clubs consist of a moderator and an executive board made up of seniors (normally) and are elected by the fellow members of that club. It is encouraged to join as many clubs as possible by the school. Some of the clubs that are run are:

Anime Club
Asian Interest Club
Dominican Youth in Action Club
Drama Club
Glee Club and Dominoes
Hospitality Club
Liturgical Choir
Math Club
Metropolitan Club
Mock Trial Club
Multicultural-World Languages Club
National Honor Society
Peer Ministry Program
Publications:
Elan Literary Magazine
The Trumpet (Newspaper)
Domenica (Yearbook)
Student Council
SOFAR (Student Organization for Animal Rights)
Student Ambassador Club

Notable alumni
 Dolores Lee (born 1935), former pitcher who played from  through  in the All-American Girls Professional Baseball League.

References

External links
Saint Dominic Academy website
 Data for Saint Dominic Academy, National Center for Education Statistics

1878 establishments in New Jersey
Education in Jersey City, New Jersey
Educational institutions established in 1878
Girls' schools in New Jersey
Middle States Commission on Secondary Schools
New Jersey Association of Independent Schools
Private high schools in Hudson County, New Jersey
Catholic secondary schools in New Jersey
Roman Catholic Archdiocese of Newark
Dominican schools in the United States